Charles Deane may refer to:

 Charles Deane (painter) (1794–1874), British painter.
 Charles Anthony Deane (1796–1848), UK diving engineer
 Charles B. Deane (1898–1969), US representative from North Carolina
 Charles B. Deane Jr. (1937–2022), American lawyer and politician
 Charles Deane (cricketer) (1885–1914), English cricketer
 C. W. Deane (1837–1914), American politician, Michigan State Representative

See also 
 Charles Dean (died 1974), American man killed in Laos
 Charles S. Dean, Sr. (born 1939), American politician from Florida